North Side is a town and district in the Cayman Islands. Located on the northern coast of Grand Cayman, in 2021 it had a population of 1,902.

There is a primary school and high school in the district, as well as an association football team called the North Side FC.

References

Populated places in the Cayman Islands
Grand Cayman